The National Oceanic and Atmospheric Administration Fisheries Office of Law Enforcement (NOAA OLE) is a federal police part of the National Marine Fisheries Service of the National Oceanic and Atmospheric Administration, headquartered in Silver Spring, Maryland. The leadership consists of Director James Landon, Deputy Director Logan Gregory, Assistant Director Todd Dubois, and Budget Chief Milena Seelig.

It was established in 1930 as the Division of Law Enforcement, U.S. Fish Commission and Bureau. It is responsible for the ecosystem protection and conservation of most of national marine life. It is the only federal agency for such purposes. , it has more than 200 employees.

NOAA OLE is divided into five (5) divisional offices (Northeast, Southeast, Alaska, West Coast and Pacific Islands), led by an Assistant Director, and 52 field offices, e.g., Pago Pago, American Samoa; Ellsworth, Maine; and San Juan, Puerto Rico.

State partners
OLE maintains working relationships with state agencies under Cooperative Enforcement Agreements (CEAs). Partners include:

Alabama, Alaska, American Samoa, California, the Commonwealth of Northern Marianas, Delaware, Connecticut, Florida, Georgia, Guam, Hawaii, Louisiana, Maine, Maryland, Massachusetts, Mississippi, New Hampshire, New Jersey, New York, Oregon, Rhode Island, South Carolina, Texas, Virginia, and Washington.

Laws and statutes enforced
 The Magnuson-Stevens Fishery Conservation and Management Act (MSFCMA) (16 U.S.C. 1801)
 Sustainable Fisheries Act of 1996
 High Seas Driftnet Act of 1992 (16 U.S.C. 18269)
 The Endangered Species Act of 1973 (ESA) (16 U.S.C. 1531)
 The Marine Mammal Protection Act of 1972 (MMPA) (16 U.S.C. 1361)
 The Lacey Act Amendments of 1983 (Lacey) (16 U.S.C. 3371)
 The Marine Sanctuaries Act (NMSA) (16 U.S.C. 1431)
 Florida Keys National Marine Sanctuary and Protection Act
 American Fisheries Act of 1998 (Public Law 105-277)
 Certificate of Legal Origin for Anadromous Fish Products (16 U.S.C. 1822 note, Section 801 (f)
 Antarctic Conservation Act of 1978 (16 U.S.C. 2401-2413) 
 Antarctic Marine Living Resources Convention Act of 1984 (16 U.S.C. 2431-2444)
 Antarctic Protection Act of 1990 (16 U.S.C. 2465[a])
 Atlantic Coastal Fisheries Cooperative Management Act (16 U.S.C. 5103[b])
 Atlantic Tunas Convention Act of 1975 (16 U.S.C. 971-971k)
 Atlantic Salmon Convention Act of 1982 (16 U.S.C. 3601-3608)
 Atlantic Striped Bass Conservation Act of 1984 (16 U.S.C. 1851 note)
 Deep Seabed Hard Mineral Resources Act of 1980 (30 U.S.C. 1401 et seq)
 Dolphin Protection Consumer Information Act (16 U.S.C. 1385 et seq)
 Driftnet Impact Monitoring, Assessment and Control Act (16 U.S.C. 1822 note section 4006)
 Eastern Pacific Tuna Licensing Agreement Act of 1984 (16 U.S.C. 972-972h)
 Fish and Seafood Promotion Act (16 U.S.C. 4001-4017)
 Fisherman's Protective Act of 1967 (22 U.S.C. 1980[g])
 Fur Seal Act Amendments of 1983 (16 U.S.C. 1151-1175)
 High Seas Fishing Compliance Act (16 U.S.C. 5506[a])
 Land Remote-Sensing Policy Act of 1992 (15 U.S.C. 5601 et seq)
 Northern Pacific Anadromous Stocks Convention Act of 1992 (16 U.S.C. 5001-5012)
 Northern Pacific Halibut Act of 1982 (16 U.S.C. 773-773k) 
 Ocean Thermal Energy Conservation Act of 1980 (42 U.S.C. 9101 et seq)
 Pacific Salmon Treaty Act of 1985 (16 U.S.C 3631-3644)
 Shark Finning Prohibition Act (16 U.S.C. 1822).
 South Pacific Tuna Act of 1988 (16 U.S.C. 3631-3644)
 Sponge Act of 1906 (16 U.S.C. 781 et seq)
 Tuna Convention Act of 1950 (15 U.S.C. 951-961)
 Weather Modifications Reporting Act (15 U.S.C. 330-330e)
 Whaling Convention Act of 1949 (16 U.S.C. 916-916l)

See also 

 List of United States federal law enforcement agencies
 CITES (Convention on International Trade in Endangered Species of Wild Fauna and Flora)
 United States Fish and Wildlife Service
 United States Fish and Wildlife Service Office of Law Enforcement
 U.S. Coast Guard
 Coast Guard Investigative Service

References

Office of Law Enforcement
Silver Spring, Maryland (CDP)
Government agencies established in 1970
1970 establishments in the United States
Agency-specific police departments of the United States